María Esther Gorostiza Rodríguez (28 October 1931 – 18 May 2019), better known as Analía Gadé, was an Argentine film actress. She appeared in more than 60 films between 1948 and 2001. She appeared in the film Emergency Ward, which was entered into the 1953 Cannes Film Festival. She was born in Córdoba, Argentina, and was the sister of Carlos Gorostiza. Three years after being diagnosed with cancer, she died on 18 May 2019, at the age of 87.

Partial filmography

 La serpiente de cascabel (1948) - Alumna
 La Rubia Mireya (1948) - Lucía Robles
 Vidalita (1949)
 Cita en las estrellas (1949)
 Nacha Regules (1950)
 Don Fulgencio (1950) - Trinidad
 Especialista en señoras (1951)
 With the Music in my Soul (1951)
 Emergency Ward (1952)
 Vuelva el primero (1952) - Dorita
 The Corsican Brothers (1955)
 Yesterday Was Spring (1955) - Silvia
 Los tallos amargos (1956)
 La vida por delante (1958) - Josefina Castro
 La vida alrededor (1959) - Josefina Castro
 La fiel infantería (1960) - Elisa
 The Crossroads (1960) - Sandra
 For Men Only (1960) - Flora Sandoval
 Madame (1961) - Caroline Bonaparte
 You and Me Are Three (1962) - Manolina
 Four Nights of the Full Moon (1963)
 Crime on a Summer Morning (1965) - Consuelo Dermott
 Las Locas del conventillo (1966) - Lola
 Another's Wife (1967) - Pepa
 La vil seducción (1968) - Alicia Prades
 No disponible (1969)
 Pecados conyugales (1969) - Sofía
 El monument (1970) - María
 Coqueluche (1970) - Victoria Valdor
 In the Eye of the Hurricane (1971) - Ruth
 Exorcism's Daughter (1971) - Tania
 Nothing Less Than a Real Man (1972) - Julia Yáñez
 The Doubt (1972) - Lucrecia - Condesa de Lain
 Maniac Mansion (1972) - Elsa
 My Private Teacher (1973) - Francisca
 The King is the Best Mayor (1974) - Felicia
 The Marriage Revolution (1974) - Begoña 
 Long Vacations of 36 (1976) - Virginia
 Las marginadas (1977) - Consuelo
 Cartas de amor de una monja (1978) - Madre Mariana de la Cruz
 La rosa Azul (2001)

Television
 Tropicana Club (1952) – (3 episodes)
 La señora García se confiesa (1976) – (4 episodes)
 Fragmentos de interior (1984) – (4 episodes)
 Lucía Bonelli (1984) – (39 episodes)
 Una gloria nacional (1993) – (9 episodes)
 Compuesta y sin novio (1994) – (13 episodes)
 Carmen y familia (1996) – (16 episodes)

References

External links

1931 births
2019 deaths
Argentine film actresses
Actresses from Córdoba, Argentina
Argentine expatriates in Spain
Deaths from cancer in Spain
20th-century Argentine actresses